The will of Henry VIII of England was a significant constitutional document, or set of contested documents created in the 1530s and 1540s, affecting English and Scottish politics for the rest of the 16th century. In conjunction with legislation passed by the English Parliament, it was supposed to have a regulative effect in deciding the succession to the three following monarchs of the House of Tudor, the three legitimate and illegitimate children (the Third Succession Act expressly recognised the  illegitimacy of Henry's daughters) of King Henry VIII of England. Its actual legal and constitutional status was much debated; and arguably the succession to Elizabeth I of England did not respect Henry's wishes.

Last testament
Henry VIII made a final revision to his last will and testament on  30 December 1546. It was signed using the "dry stamp", a device in use since 1545 and under the control of Anthony Denny and John Gates. It confirmed the line of succession as one living male and six living females. It began with:
1. Edward
2. Mary
3. Elizabeth
Then the three daughters of Frances Grey, Duchess of Suffolk, who was the second child and eldest daughter of Henry VIII's younger sister, Princess Mary: 
4. Jane
5. Katherine
6. Mary
Finally the daughter of Eleanor Clifford, Countess of Cumberland, who was the daughter of the king's younger sister, Mary Tudor, Queen of France, and the grandchild of Henry VII of England and Elizabeth of York:
7. Margaret. 

The will containing the line of succession was read, stamped and sealed on 27 January 1547, when the dying king was past speech. He died within hours, the next day.

The document is still extant, but this fact was not generally known or accepted by the 1560s, when some believed it was lost, or had been destroyed.

Executors
The will appointed 16 executors. That body had little impact in the short term because its powers were given to a smaller group. It was officially (with one other) the council of Edward VI of England until 12 March 1547, when Protector Somerset nominated the council. The effective end of the Somerset Protectorate came in early 1550. Those executors who were still alive (13 of the original 16, Browne, Denny and then Wriothesley having died) had a leading constitutional role, in theory from 13 October 1549.

The executors comprised:

Pollard wrote that the traditional view, that the balance of the group of executors on the religious question was deliberately poised to create an equilibrium, is mistaken since the exclusion of Stephen Gardiner tipped the balance to the evangelical reformers. MacCulloch considers that in 1550, after the fall of Somerset, there was a balance but that the evangelicals manoeuvred to a position of superiority.

Third Succession Act

The constitutional standing of Henry VIII's last will depended on the Third Succession Act that received royal assent in 1544. Section VI of the act provides that the line of succession, if not continued by the king's children by his marriages, should be regulated by the contents of the king's last will. The wording is conditional on the will being signed by the king's hand. The issue of the "dry stamp" signature was brought up in the context of Anglo-Scottish diplomacy, carried out by Robert Melville on behalf of Mary, Queen of Scots, in 1567. Since the provisions of the will disadvantaged all the claimants of the House of Stuart, the point remained important.

Notes

References

Text of the Will, as printed in Rymer's Foedera, XV, 110-17
Extract from the will of King Henry VIII containing the provisions for succession to the crown - www.oxford-shakespeare.com

Works by Henry VIII
1546 works
16th-century documents
Henry 8
1530s in England
1540s in England